Frederick Coles FSA Scot (1854–1929) was an archaeologist, artist, naturalist and musician. For many years he worked as Assistant Keeper at the National Museum of Antiquities of Scotland in Edinburgh from where he was funded to make a series of annual field archaeology expeditions to survey and draw stone circles in Scotland.

Life

Frederick Rhenius Coles was born in 1854 in Bellary, East India where his parents were missionaries. He was educated in Britain from the age of six being looked after by his extended family. At one time he attended Edinburgh Academy.  In 1881 he was married to Mary and living in Tongland near Kirkcudbright.
After his first wife died he married Margaret Neilson Blacklock (sister of the artist) of Kirkcudbright and they had two daughters and three sons. Coles died in 1929.

Painting
He embarked on a career as an artist but little of his work has survived in public collections. In Kirkcudbright he was a landscape and marine painter, working between 1873 and 1889, an associate of Edward Hornel, Thomas Bromley Blacklock and the Kirkcudbright Artists' Colony. He exhibited at the Royal Scottish Academy in the period 1873 to 1879. He conducted for the Kirkcudbright Musical Association and his interest in music may have influenced his son Cecil F.G Coles to become a musician. He took an active part in the Kirkudbright Field Naturalists' Club and the Kirkubbright Fine Arts Association.

Archaeology

He became interested in natural history and then field archaeology – in particular, castles, stone circles and cup markings on the stones. Eventually, he surveyed and drew over 130 stone circles and 60 castles across Scotland and from 1895 regularly published his surveys and drawings in the Proceedings of Scottish Antiquaries of Scotland – the journal of the Society of Antiquaries of Scotland – producing the first detailed descriptive catalogue of stone circles in Scotland.
His drawings were accurate and meticulous – some are now kept at the Stewartry Museum in Kirkcudbright.

His archaeological reputation led to his being invited to apply to become Assistant Keeper at the National Museum of Antiquities of Scotland in Queen Street, Edinburgh in 1899, working under the Keeper Joseph Anderson. Until 1910 he received annual Gunning Fellowships allowing him to embark on archaeological field trips every year and eventually taking his children along with him after his second wife’s death. His children were able help him with taking measurements. Coles was the first person to highlight the contrasting colour of some of the stones, caused by the differing petrology, which was then neglected again until recent years. He was also the first archaeologist to speak to local inhabitants to try to understand the histories of the circles, including those that had been damaged or destroyed in living memory.

Coles was involved in two debt scandals but was exonerated from the first. In 1911 he was dismissed from the museum after another problem over debt for which he was convicted and served a sentence in Calton Prison.

Great Crowns of Stone, the 2011 RCAHMS book about the recumbent stone circles of Scotland is dedicated in memory of Coles. The author, Adam Welfare, considers Coles to be in the first rank of those investigating the Scottish stone circles, for example Tomnaverie stone circle. He says that Coles was disdainful of archaeoastronomy, and he did not take part in speculation on the purposes of the stone circles – he restricted himself to recording their details. He was able to secure repeated awards through his diligent work and prompt publication.

Gunning Fellowship publications

Coles (1910) includes an overall summary tabulating sizes of various circles, pages 163–168

Notes

References

19th-century Scottish painters
Scottish male painters
1854 births
1929 deaths
Landscape artists
Scottish archaeologists
20th-century archaeologists
Scottish antiquarians
20th-century antiquarians
19th-century Scottish male artists